

Belgium
 Belgian Congo – Léon Pétillon, Governor-General of Belgian Congo (1952–1958)

France
 French Somaliland – René Petitbon, Governor of French Somaliland (1954–1957)
 Guinea – 
 Jean Paul Parisot, Governor of Guinea (1953–1955)
 Charles-Henri Bonfils, Governor of Guinea (1955–1956)

Portugal
 Angola – 
 José Agapito de Silva Carvalho, High Commissioner of Angola (1948–1955)
 Manoel de Gusmão Mascarenhas Gaivão, High Commissioner of Angola (1955–1956)

United Kingdom
 Anglo-Egyptian Sudan – Sir Alexander Knox Helm, Governor-General of Sudan (1954–1955)
 Note:  Anglo-Egyptian Sudan gained independence on 1 January 1956, becoming the Republic of Sudan
 Aden – Sir Tom Hickinbotham, Governor of Aden (1951–1956)
 Malta Colony – Sir Robert Laycock, Governor of Malta (1954–1959)
 Northern Rhodesia''' – Sir Arthur Benson, Governor of Northern Rhodesia (1954–1959)

Colonial governors
Colonial governors
1955